was an embankment dam on the Isawa River in the city of Ōshū, Iwate, Japan, constructed between 1945 and 1953. It was submerged by the reservoir of the taller and larger Isawa Dam downstream in 2013.

References 

Dams in Iwate Prefecture
Dams completed in 1953
Rock-filled dams
Ōshū, Iwate
Hydroelectric power stations in Japan